Polychain Capital (Polychain) is an American investment firm based in San Francisco, California. The firm focuses on investments related to cryptocurrency and blockchain technology.

Background 

Polychain Capital was founded in 2016 by Olaf Carlson-Wee. Prior to founding Polychain, Carlson-Wee was an employee of Coinbase where he was Head of Risk.

Investors of Polychain include Andreessen Horowitz,  Sequoia Capital, Union Square Ventures and Founders Fund. In 2018, Tekin Salimi joined as the General Partner, to focus on early-stage venture investments in emerging bitcoin protocols and businesses.

In January 2018, the firm considered holding an initial public offering on the Toronto Stock Exchange to raise $325 million but eventually decided not to proceed with it.

The firm claimed $1 billion assets at the start of 2018 but dropped to $591.5 million as of the end of 2018, majorly due to the drop in the value of its holdings. 

Companies that Polychain Capital has invested in include Coinbase, Kik Messenger and Tezos.

References

Financial services companies established in 2016
Companies based in San Francisco
Hedge funds